Illinois Route 105 (IL-105) is a highway in the U.S. state of Illinois. It is an east–west highway that runs from Illinois Route 48 in Decatur to Interstate 72 near Monticello.

Route description 
The state highway serves a corn-and-soybean-growing region in Macon County and Piatt County.  Roads such as IL-105 carry corn and soybeans to the refineries of Decatur for the manufacture of commodities such as soybean oil and corn syrup.

Rural towns along Illinois Route 105 include Bement and Cerro Gordo.  The highway also runs past the Bryant Cottage State Historic Site.

History 
SBI Route 105 was what Illinois Route 104 is now from Meredosia to Quincy from 1924 thru 1937. In 1945, the number was reused on former Illinois Route 47 north of Decatur. This is the current routing for Illinois 105.

Major Intersections

References

External links

 Illinois Highway Ends: Illinois Route 105

105
Transportation in Piatt County, Illinois
Transportation in Macon County, Illinois